Pierre Rigoulot (born 1944) is a French historian and author. The author of L'antiaméricanisme, he contributed to Stéphane Courtois' The Black Book of Communism and helped Kang Chol-Hwan write The Aquariums of Pyongyang. In 2006, he prefaced France Intox, published by Editions Underbahn.

References

External links

Interview with Human Rights Without Frontiers

20th-century French historians
Living people
1944 births
Experts on North Korea
French male non-fiction writers
Historians of communism
21st-century French historians